The Public Emergency Radio of the United States was a communications system planned during the cold war era in the 1970s, to be activated in anticipation of a nuclear attack. The radio system was designed to broadcast on 167, 179 and 191 kHz in the long wave radio band. The distribution stations would be activated by two "control stations" at 61.15 kHz, in Ault, Colorado and Cambridge, Kansas.

The system was not implemented.

See also
WGU-20
HANDEL
Four minute warning
Emergency Broadcast System
Wartime Broadcasting Service
Cold War history of the United States
Defunct radio networks in the United States
Emergency Alert System
Defunct radio stations in the United States